Mohamed Abd El-Salam (born 12 January 1982) is an Egyptian handball player. He competed in the 2004 and 2008 Summer Olympics.

References

1982 births
Living people
Handball players at the 2004 Summer Olympics
Handball players at the 2008 Summer Olympics
Egyptian male handball players
Olympic handball players of Egypt